Ransford Selasi (born 19 August 1996) is a Ghanaian professional footballer who plays as a midfielder.

Club career
Selasi was born in Ghana and joined the Italian club Pescara at an early age, and progressed through the club's youth systems. On 2 December 2013 he made his first-team debut, coming on as a late substitute in a 0–3 loss against Spezia at Stadio Alberto Picco in that season's Coppa Italia.

On 31 August 2018, he joined Serie C club Fano on a season-long loan.

On 30 August 2019, he moved to Juventus on a permanent basis. On 14 February 2020, he was loaned to FC Lugano in Switzerland until the end of the 2019–20 season.

FC Lugano bought Selasi free by the end of the loan spell. Selasi made no appearances for Lugano in the first half of the 2020–21 season, why he signed a loan deal on 11 January 2021 with SC Kriens for the rest of the season.

References

External links 

1996 births
People from Ashanti Region
Living people
Ghanaian footballers
Association football midfielders
Delfino Pescara 1936 players
Novara F.C. players
U.S. Lecce players
Alma Juventus Fano 1906 players
Juventus Next Gen players
FC Lugano players
SC Kriens players
Serie B players
Serie C players
Swiss Super League players
Ghanaian expatriate footballers
Ghanaian expatriate sportspeople in Italy
Expatriate footballers in Italy
Ghanaian expatriate sportspeople in Switzerland
Expatriate footballers in Switzerland